Zebinella princeps is a species of minute sea snail, a marine gastropod mollusk or micromollusk in the family Rissoinidae.

Distribution
This species occurs in the Gulf of Mexico, the Caribbean Sea and the Lesser Antilles; in the Atlantic Ocean off Northern Brazil.

Description 
The maximum recorded shell length is 15 mm.

Habitat 
Minimum recorded depth is 0 m. Maximum recorded depth is 86 m.

References

 Adams, C. B., 1850. Descriptions of supposed new species of marine shells, which inhabit Jamaica. Contributions to Conchology 7: 109-123 page(s): 116
 Rosenberg, G., F. Moretzsohn, and E. F. García. 2009. Gastropoda (Mollusca) of the Gulf of Mexico, Pp. 579–699 in Felder, D.L. and D.K. Camp (eds.), Gulf of Mexico–Origins, Waters, and Biota. Biodiversity. Texas A&M Press, College Station, Texas.

Rissoinidae
Gastropods described in 1850